Bill Leeroy Antonio (born 3 September 2002) is a Zimbabwean professional footballer who plays as a winger for the Zimbabwe Premier League club Dynamos, and the Zimbabwe national team.

International career
Antonio made his international debut with the Zimbabwe national team in a 1–0 2022 FIFA World Cup qualification loss to South Africa on 11 November 2021. He was part of the Zimbabwe squad the 2021 Africa Cup of Nations.

References

External links
 
 

2002 births
Living people
Sportspeople from Harare
Zimbabwean footballers
Zimbabwe international footballers
Zimbabwe Premier Soccer League players
Association football wingers
2021 Africa Cup of Nations players
Dynamos F.C. players